Vengo, or Babungo, is a Grassfields language and the language of the Vengo people from the village of Babungo in the Cameroonian Grassfields. The spelling Bamungo is also often found.

In their own language, the Vengo people call their village vengo and their language ghang vengo, which means "language of the Vengo"; it is thus officially listed under the name Vengo or Vengoo. Other names for the language are Vengi, Pengo, Ngo, Nguu, Ngwa, Nge.

Vengo is spoken by about 14,000 people. Because the Babungo people all live closely together and concentrate only in and around Vengo village, there are only small dialectical variations in their speech.

The Vengo language uses different tone pitches, which form a distinctive feature for the meaning of the words. In the Vengo tone system, there are eight distinctive pitch types or pitch sequences on vowels: high, mid, low, high-mid, high-low, low-falling, low-high, low-high-mid.

The use of the language (and traditional Babungo customs) is decreasing among the Babungo people due to not insignificant socio-cultural problems in that region. In most cases, those people acquire English as mother tongue, if they stay predominantly in the anglophone Northwest of Cameroon, otherwise French if they orient themselves towards the francophone parts of Cameroon. Most of the people in Western Cameroon speak Cameroonian Pidgin English anyway.

Bibliography

Willi Schaub: Babungo. Croom Helm Descriptive Grammars. Croom Helm Ltd., Beckenham, Kent, UK 1985, .

References

Endangered Niger–Congo languages
Ring languages
Languages of Cameroon